Elections were held in the Regional Municipality of Durham in Ontario, on October 24, 2022, in conjunction with municipal elections across the province.
Registration for candidates officially opened on Monday, May 2, 2022, and the deadline for candidate nominations is Friday, August 19 at 2 p.m.

Candidates marked with an (X) indicates they are the incumbent for that position.

Durham Regional Council

Durham Regional Chair
Voters from across the Durham Region directly elected the Durham Regional Chair. The following are the unofficial results for Durham Regional Chair.

Ajax

Ajax elected 1 mayor, 3 regional councillors in 1 of 3 wards, and 3 local councillors in 1 of 3 wards.

The following are the unofficial results in the Town of Ajax.

Mayor

Regional Councillors

Local Councillors

Brock
Brock elected 1 mayor, 1 regional councillor, and 5 local councillors in 1 of 5 wards.

The following are the unofficial results in the Township of Brock.

Mayor

Regional Councillor

Local Councillors

Clarington

Clarington elected 1 mayor, 2 regional councillors in 1 of 2 wards, and 4 local councillors in 1 of 4 wards.

The following are the unofficial results in the Municipality of Clarington.

Mayor

Regional Councillors

Local Councillors

Oshawa
Oshawa elected 1 mayor, 1 regional and city councillors in 1 of 5 wards, and 5 city councillors in 1 of 5 wards.

The following are the unofficial results in the City of Oshawa.

Mayor

Regional & City Councillors

City Councillors

Pickering
Pickering elected 1 mayor, 3 regional councillors in 1 of 3 wards, and 3 city councillors in 1 of 3 wards.

The following are the unofficial results in the City of Pickering.

Mayor

Incumbent mayor Dave Ryan did not run for re-election. Running to replace him were regional councillor Kevin Ashe, Janice Frampton and Bradley Nazar.

Regional Councillors

City Councillors

Scugog
Scugog elected 1 mayor, 1 regional councillor, and 5 local councillors in 1 of 5 wards.

The following are the unofficial results in the Township of Scugog.

Mayor
Incumbent mayor Bobbie Drew will not be running for re-election.

Regional Councillor

Local Councillors

Uxbridge
Uxbridge elected 1 mayor, 1 regional councillor, and 5 local councillors in 1 of 5 wards.

The following are the unofficial results in the Township of Uxbridge.

Mayor

Regional Councillor

Local Councillors

Whitby

Whitby elected 1 mayor, 4 regional councillors, and 4 local councillors in 1 of 4 wards.

The following are the unofficial results in the Town of Whitby.

Mayor

Local councillor Deidre Newman, regional councillor Elizabeth Roy and Evan Griffiths are the candidates to replace incumbent mayor Don Mitchell who is not running for re-election.

Regional Councillors

Local Councillors

References

Durham
Politics of the Regional Municipality of Durham